Rhytidodidae is a family of trematodes belonging to the order Plagiorchiida.

Genera:
 Rhytidodes Looss, 1901
 Rhytidodoides Price, 1939

References

Plagiorchiida